Otger Cataló (or  'Catalon' ) is a legendary character who with the Nine Barons of Fame would have conquered Catalonia from the Saracens sometime in the 8th century AD. According to some old theories, the name of Catalonia would have derived from its surname. In any case, the oldest written references to this character that have survived are from the fifteenth century, much later than any contemporaneous source. The legend was recovered mainly from XIX with the appearance of Renessaince and by the works of the authors of the Catalan Renaixença: Víctor Balaguer, Antoni Ferrer i Codina and Jacinto Verdaguer. The legend is based on events that occurred in three different generations. Otger agrees in the name and on the date of death with Otger (671-735),  Arcomte de Catalanum  (710-735), Duke of Aquitaine, who died in the battle for the reconquest of Roses and was buried in the Monastery of the island of Ré.

The Legend
According to the legend, Otger Cataló survived the Saracen attack that reached the Pyrenean valleys. All the Christian warriors had died. Only he survived, wounded and hidden in the mountains of the Pyrenees.

Under the protection of his goat's skin shop, he was treated by the affection of his greyhound, who daily wound his wounds. Otger, little by little, has recovered. It was fed on wild fruits and the milk of a sheep. To the extent that they were being healed, Otger Cataló devoted himself to preparing weapons with the desire to fight again against the invaders of Catalonia. Polia shielded and sharpened the dagger.

Over time, the day came when Otger considered that he had recovered all vigor. Then he took the hunting horn and made it resound deeply and prolonged, so that his hoarse flake flew through valleys and mountains spreading all over the country. Thus he summoned his men, the faithful Christians to the earth, to the fight.

The greyhound, interpreting the call of his master, undertook a fast and untiring race until he found the first man and made him understand with his dreams that he wanted him to follow. The man, following the dog, was led to the presence of Otger Cataló, who gave him the message that he informed the lords of the earth that the moment to fight again against the Saracens had arrived. The messenger went to give the news to the main characters of the territory to take the weapons they had at their disposal.

Thus, nine different places, came with their hosts the most beloved barons of the earth with the pleasure of reconquering the territories. These nine knights were: [Galceran de Cervelló], Bernat Roger d'Erill, Gispert de Ribelles, Dapifer de Montcada, Galceran de Cervera, Galceran de Pinós, Bernat d'Anglesola, Guerau de Alamany and Hug de Mataplana, known as the Nine Barons of Fame or the Nine Knights of the Earth.

Otger Cataló urged them to fight until death by the land that had seen them be born until liberated from Saracen power.

The nine knights joined the swords, swearing before the altar of the black Marededéu de Montgrony, who would loyally fulfill their word.

The horsemen, with Otger, started off for the combat, each one towards a different place, and achieved the most resounding victories. The only one that got injured again was Otger Cataló, during the battle to reconquer Roses, in 735, but this time as a triumphant. Otger Cataló, before dying, ordered that his shield be decorated with the symbol of the greyhound because this animal had given evidence of unconditional and endless loyalty.

References

History of Catalonia
Legendary Spanish people